Victor Mensah (born 25 December 1985) is a Ghanaian professional footballer who plays as a midfielder for Thai League T2 club Nongbua Pitchaya.

Career

Provincial Electricity Authority
He joined in 2008 to Provincial Electricity Authority and won the Thailand Premier League in 2008.

Honours

Club
Provincial Electricity Authority
 Thai Premier League (1): 2008

References

External links

1985 births
Living people
Ghanaian footballers
Association football midfielders
Victor Mensah
Victor Mensah
Victor Mensah
Victor Mensah
Victor Mensah
Ghanaian expatriate footballers
Ghanaian expatriate sportspeople in Thailand
Expatriate footballers in Thailand